Lekki is a city in Lagos State, Nigeria. It is located to the south-east of Lagos city. Lekki is a naturally formed peninsula, adjoining to its west Victoria Island and Ikoyi districts of Lagos, with the Atlantic Ocean to its south, Lagos Lagoon to the north, and Lekki Lagoon to its east; however, the city's southeast, which ends around the western edge of Refuge Island, adjoins the eastern part of Ibeju-Lekki LGA.

The city is still largely under construction, as of 2015, only phase 1 of the project had been completed, with phase 2 nearing completion. The peninsula is approximately 70 to 80 km long, with an average width of 10 km. Lekki currently houses several gated residential developments, agricultural farmlands, areas allocated for a Free Trade Zone, with an airport, and a sea port under construction. The proposed land-use master plan for Lekki envisages the Peninsula as a "Blue-Green Environment City", expected to accommodate well over a residential population of 3.4 million in addition to a non-residential population of at least 1.9 million.

Part of the Lekki peninsula was formerly known as Maroko, a slum, before it was destroyed by the Raji Rasaki-led Lagos State military government. One of its neighbourhoods, Lekki phase 1, has a reputation of having some of the most expensive real estate in Lagos State.

History

Overview

In 2006, the Master Plan of Lekki Free Trade Zone, covering a total area of 155 square kilometres at the easternmost end of the peninsula, was initiated and prepared by the State Government of Lagos. The Plan defined the free zone as a special multi-functional economic zone and a new modern city with several south-west and north–south traffic corridors. Later in July 2008, the blueprint of developing the entire Lekki Peninsula into a 'Blue-Green Environment City' was proposed by the state Government, which covers an additional area of 600 square kilometres. The Lekki City plan was prepared by Messrs Dar al Handersah, Shair and Partners, for Lagos State Ministry of Urban Planning and Physical Development.

Based on the proposed land-use plan, Lekki city, excluding the Lekki Free Zone, will be divided into 4 linear development zones; the North Urban Zone, which will be largely residential; the Natural Park Zone, which will consist of an environmental and nature conservation park; the South Urban Zone, which will include the existing and new residential developments along with commercial and mixed uses, as well as light industry; and the Atlantic Coastal Zone, which will mainly be developed for tourism and recreational activities. The land-use master plan will stipulate a total built-up area of about 100 square kilometres, which can accommodate a residential population of about 3.4 million and non-residential population (touristic, hotels, commercial, offices, medical and industrial) of about 1.9 million. Several institutions, estates and new investments are springing up along the Lekki axis that has been described as "the fastest growing corridor in west African sub-region".

Lekki Free Trade Zone

Lekki Free Trade Zone (Lekki FTZ) is a free zone situated at the eastern part of Lekki, which covers a total area of about 155 square kilometres. The first phase of the zone has an area of 30 square kilometres, with about 27 square kilometres for urban construction purposes, which would accommodate a total resident population of 120,000. According to the Master Plan, the free zone will be developed into a new modern city within a city with integration of industries, commerce and business, real estate development, warehousing and logistics, tourism, and entertainment.

Lekki FTZ is divided into three functional districts; the residential district in the north, industrial district in the middle and commercial trading/warehousing & logistics district in the southeast. The "sub-centre" located in the south of the Zone is to be developed first. The region is close to the customs supervisory area, and it is mainly for commercial trading, logistics and warehousing operations. The second phase is located in the north of the Zone adjacent to E9 Road (Highway) which will serve as central business district of the free zone. The area along E2 Road will be developed for financial and commercial businesses, estate properties & supporting facilities, high-end production service industries and so on, which will link it to the sub-centre the Zone. The area along E4 Road will be utilized mainly for the development of logistics and industrial manufacturing/processing. A number of connection axes are also planned in-between the principal axis and the sub-axis, with multi-functional service nodes to serve the whole of Lekki FTZ. Dangote Refinery is currently being built in the Lekki Free Zone.

In the start-up area of the Lekki Free Trade Zone, there will be a Commercial & Logistics Park which will cover a total area of 1.5 square kilometres. The Park was planned to be multi-functional with the integration of commerce, trading, warehousing, and exhibition. According to the Site Plan of the park, large construction works will be built in the park, including the "international commodities & trade centre", the "international exhibition & conversation centre", industrial factory workshops, logistics warehouses, office buildings, hotels and residential apartment buildings, amongst others.

Cultural

Lekki Conservation Centre

Lekki Conservation Centre (LCC) is one of the major Nigerian Conservation Foundation (NCF) conservation sites. It covers a land area of 78 hectares in Lekki. The Conservation Centre was established in the 1990, before the development of Lekki, for the conservation of wildlife found in southwest coastal environment of Nigeria, in the face of sprawling urban development. The project has promoted environmental protection and worked against poaching by surrounding communities as well as serve as a tourist centre for local and international visitors.

Over two million tourists of more than 100 nationals have visited Lekki Conservation Centre since its establishment. Most of NCF's School Conservation Clubs were established following the impact of individual visit to the centre. LCC land area is divided into two sections: the LCC Complex and the nature reserve.  The LCC Complex comprises a multi-purpose rotunda surrounded by four office blocks, containing project staff offices, a gift shop, a canteen and the drivers’ office. The nature reserve consists of a mosaic of vegetation types, which includes: secondary forest, swamp forest, and Savanna grassland.

Tourist sites and monuments 

 Enu Owa Shrine, Isale Eko.
 lga Idunganran, Isale-Eko, – Official residence of the Oba [King] of Lagos since 1670.
 Lagos Bar Beach, Victoria Island, Lagos.
 Holy Cross Cathedral — Cradle and seat of the Roman Catholic Mission in Nigeria.
 Nigeria Conservation Centre, Igbo-Efon, Eti-Osa.
 Old Colonial Nigeria Secretariat, Marina Lagos.
 Old Federal Parliament Building, Race Course, Lagos.
 Old Glover's Hausa Guard Mosque [Obalende Central Mosque], Obalende, Lagos.
 Tafawa Balewa Square, Race Course – National Ceremonial Parade Ground, 1863–1991.

Education

Lekki British School, a British international school, is in Lekki.

The American International School of Lagos maintains the Lekki Campus.

The Italian International School "Enrico Mattei" has its campus in Lekki.

The Pan Atlantic University which started as Lagos Business School is located in Lekki.

Notable neighbourhoods
Ajah
Ikate-Elegushi
Jakande
Phase 1
Chevron
Victoria Garden City

Transport
The proposed Lekki-Epe International Airport would serve the area as a second airport for Lagos, and the Green Line of the future Lagos Rail Mass Transit will connect Lekki with Lagos city.

Notable Residents
1. Alibaba Akpobome
2. Bimbo Bakare
3. 2Baba
4. Funke Akindele
5. Bobrisky

Major Business Precincts
1. Shoprite Lekki Mall
2. Spar
3. Chevron Drive
4. Ajah Market
5. Ikota

Tourist Attractions
Lekki is a peninsula, bordered in the south by the Atlantic Ocean and in the North by the Lagos Lagoon. The main attractions are its numerous beaches and bustling night life.

Some notable tourist attractions are:

1. Lekki Conservation Centre

2. LUFASI Nature Park Lagos

3. Alpha Beach, Lekki

4. Elegushi Royal Beach

5. La Campagne Tropicana Beach Resort

Places of Worship
1. House on the Rock (church)
2. The Elevation Church
3. This Present House
4. RCCG, Tabernacle of David

Gallery

See also
Centenary City
Eko Atlantic

References

 
Populated places in Lagos State
Islands of Yorubaland
Neighborhoods of Lagos